Devon Toews (born February 21, 1994) is a Canadian professional ice hockey defenceman for the  Colorado Avalanche of the National Hockey League (NHL). Nicknamed "Tazer", Toews was drafted 108th overall by the New York Islanders in the 2014 NHL Entry Draft. Toews won the Stanley Cup with the Avalanche in 2022.

Prior to turning professional, Toews attended Quinnipiac University, where he was named to the All-ECAC Hockey Second Team.

Playing career
Toews began playing youth hockey at Yale Hockey Academy at the age of six. He then played one season with the Abbotsford Hawks Bantam A1 Hawks, where he helped them win the B.C. bantam Tier 1 title and finish second at the Western Canadians. However, due to his short stature at the time, standing at 5’2”, Toews was initially overlooked by teams competing in the Western Hockey League (WHL) as he was emerging from bantam hockey. He joined the major-midget team the Fraser Valley Bruins with Mackenzie Skapski and they both suffered injuries as a result of a bus accident on December 11, 2009. Despite this, Toews returned to the Fraser Valley Bruins, where he experienced a growth spurt, and led all BC Hockey Major Midget League defencemen with 37 points in 39 games during the 2010–11 season. This earned him a roster spot on the Surrey Eagles of the British Columbia Hockey League (BCHL).

Toews played with the Surrey Eagles for two seasons. In his first season, he was named to the 2011–12 BCHL All-Rookie Team, and was offered a full hockey scholarship to play at Quinnipiac University. However, Toews returned to the Eagles for the 2012–13 season, where he won the 2013 BCHL Championship and the Western Canada Cup in Nanaimo. Toews was named MVP of the Western Canada Cup and was selected for the all-tournament team. On November 1, 2012, Toews was selected to represent Team Canada West at the 2012 World Junior A Challenge. He played in four games and earned a silver medal. He was also a member of the BCHL First All-Star Team. The Eagles competed in the 2013 Royal Bank Cup, losing to the Summerside Western Capitals in the semi-finals. Toews was nonetheless named Top Defencemen of the tournament's preliminary round.

Collegiate
Toews began his freshman year at Quinnipiac University during the 2013–14 season. While majoring in accounting, he appeared in 37 games and totaled 17 points. Toews recorded his first collegiate goal on November 27, in a 3–3 tie with Providence and ended the season with 17 points. At the conclusion of the season, he was named to the ECAC Hockey All-Academic Team due to having a GPA of 3.46. Although he had previously been skipped over twice in the NHL Entry Draft as an 18- and 19-year-old, Toews was drafted 108th overall by the New York Islanders at the 2014 NHL Entry Draft.

Unsigned to a contract, Toews returned to Quinnipiac for his following two seasons. In his sophomore season, Toews appeared in 31 games for the Bobcats. He played in the ECAC Hockey quarterfinals against Union College, where his two late period assists helped send Game One to triple overtime, which the Bobcats won. While the Bobcats beat Union in three games, they lost in the semi-finals against Harvard University. At the conclusion of the season, Toews was again named to the ECAC Hockey All-Academic Team.

Over his three seasons with the Bobcats, Toews led Quinnipiac to multiple NCAA Tournaments. During his final season with the team, he helped lead the Bobcats to the 2016 National Championship against North Dakota. Although the team lost 5–1, Toews set career highs that season in goals, assists and points, earning All-ECAC Hockey Second Team honours. He was also named a New England Second Team All-Star and was named a finalist for the ECAC Hockey Best Defensive Defenseman as he ended the season with a +27 while collecting 30 points.

Professional

New York Islanders
On April 15, 2016, Toews opted to conclude his collegiate career and signed a three-year, entry-level contract with the New York Islanders. Despite ending his collegiate career, Toews continued to take classes from Quinnipiac and graduated in May 2017. In his rookie season with Bridgeport, Toews tied all rookie defencemen in points and finished tenth in amongst all defencemen in the AHL. Toews also tied Raymond Giroux's team record for most assists by a rookie defenceman with 40. As a result, he was selected to participate in the 2017 AHL All-Star Classic and was named to the AHL's All-Rookie team at the completion of the season. During the 2017 AHL All-Star Classic, Toews won the Fastest Skater competition with a time of 13.478.

Prior to the 2017–18 season, Toews attended the Islanders training camp where he competed against Adam Pelech, Scott Mayfield, and Ryan Pulock for a spot on the final roster. He was returned to the Sound Tigers where he played in 30 games and earned 22 points before suffering a season-ending shoulder injury on December 30 in a game against the Binghamton Devils, and was forced to undergo surgery. Due to the nature of the injury, Toews was out for the remainder of the 2017–18 season. Despite not playing for the remainder of his contract, the Islanders re-signed Toews to a two-year contract extension on July 16, 2018.

After attending the Islanders' training camp ahead of the 2018–19 season, Toews was reassigned to the Sound Tigers. On December 19, 2018, Toews earned his first NHL recall after he had recorded 19 points in 24 games, which ranked second amongst Sound Tiger defencemen. Toews made his NHL debut on December 23 against the Dallas Stars while playing on a pairing with Luca Sbisa. He wore the jersey number 25, becoming the 20th Islander to don that number. On January 3, 2019, in his fifth NHL game, Toews recorded his first NHL point, the game-winning goal, in a 3–2 overtime win against the Chicago Blackhawks. He became the 18th player in the modern era to score their first NHL goal in overtime. The Islanders qualified for the 2019 Stanley Cup playoffs, where they defeated the Pittsburgh Penguins in four games. The team then faced the Carolina Hurricanes in the second round where Toews subsequently recorded his first career playoff goal on May 1, 2019. He became the third Islanders rookie defenceman in 25 years to score a postseason goal. Following their elimination, Toews trained at Quinnipiac University and in Vancouver with NHL veterans Morgan Rielly and Shea Theodore.

Colorado Avalanche
As a restricted free agent with the Islanders, due to salary cap constraints, Toews was traded by Long Island to the Colorado Avalanche in exchange for 2021 and 2022 second-round draft picks, on October 12, 2020. On October 27, Toews was signed to a four-year, $16.4 million contract with the Avalanche. In his first season with the Avalanche, he primarily played alongside Cale Makar while leading the team in ice-time per game in both regular season and playoffs.

On June 26 2022, Devon Toews would win the Stanley Cup with the Colorado Avalanche in 2022, winning his first Cup.

Personal life
Toews was born to parents Werner and Tammy Toews and was raised in Abbotsford, British Columbia, along with one brother. He is not related to the Chicago Blackhawks captain Jonathan Toews.

In September 2018, Toews became engaged to his girlfriend Kerry. They were married on October 10, 2020. In lieu of wedding favors they chose to donate money to Hockey Fights Cancer in honor of Toews' Quinnipiac teammate, Sam Anas, whose mother, Deme, died from breast cancer in August 2020.

Career statistics

Regular season and playoffs

International

Awards and honours

References

External links
 

Living people
1994 births
Bridgeport Sound Tigers players
Canadian Mennonites
Canadian ice hockey defencemen
Colorado Avalanche players
Ice hockey people from British Columbia
Sportspeople from Abbotsford, British Columbia
New York Islanders draft picks
New York Islanders players
Quinnipiac Bobcats men's ice hockey players
Stanley Cup champions
Surrey Eagles players